The Wayne B. Nottingham Prize is awarded annually at the Physical Electronics Conference (PEC), a conference that focuses on new research results in the field of surface science and in the sub-fields of physics and chemistry of interfaces. The Nottingham Prize was established from contributions given in memory of Professor Wayne B. Nottingham of the Massachusetts Institute of Technology by many of his friends and associates. It was first given in March 1966 at MIT and in March thereafter until February 1974 when the PEC was held at Bell Labs in Murray Hill, NJ. This was to avoid overlap in time with the American Physical Society "March" meeting which in the 1970s was about 30 times larger than the PEC. Due to the February weather leading to icy roads and delays in the scheduled events, in 1975 the PEC was moved to June where it still is today. The prize currently consists of a certificate and in 1974 was $200 but has increased recently to $1,500, and is awarded to the best student paper presented at the conference. A student paper is defined as a paper based on a Ph.D. thesis whose date of submission to the faculty is no earlier than one year before the meeting at which the Prize is given.

See also

 List of chemistry awards

References
Footnotes

Notes

General references

Electronics and society
American awards
Chemistry awards
Student awards